The Assize of Arms of 1252, also called the Ordinance of 1252, was a proclamation of King Henry III of England concerning the enforcement of the Assize of Arms of 1181, and the appointment of constables to summon men to arms, quell breaches of the peace, and to deliver offenders to the sheriff. British historian, F.M. Powicke identified that it was actually issued on 12 May 1242, but was subsequently transcribed incorrectly.

Along with the Ordinance of 1233 that required the appointment of watchmen, the appointment of constables has been cited as one of the earliest creation of the English police, as has the Statute of Westminster 1285.

Stubbs saw the significance of the writ of ordinance as the bringing together of two separate but long-standing modes of ensuring peace and defence, expanding the 1181 Assize of Arms by adding the system of watch and ward, and pointing the way forward to subsequent legislation along similar lines by Edward I and Henry IV.

See also 

 Assize of Arms of 1181
History of law enforcement in the United Kingdom

Notes

References 

 
 
 
 
 

English laws
Royal prerogative
1250s in law
1250s in England
History of archery
1252 in Europe